Ransom is a novel by Danielle Steel, published by Random House in February 2004.

The audiobook was read by Ron McLarty.

Plot
Peter Morgan is released from a Californian prison after four years with plans to make up to the daughters he left behind. Carl Waters, a convicted murderer, is also freed at the same time. In San Francisco, a police detective Ted Lee arrives home to a wife he no longer loves. In the Pacific Heights neighbourhood, Fernanda Barnes cries at the amount of debt her husband has left her and his children in after his death.

Soon, all their lives are connected as Fernanda's child is kidnapped and held for the ransom of a fortune that she does not have. As she and the police fight against time to get her child back safely, something happens that will change their lives forever when their lives are held for Ransom.

Reception 
The book was on The New York Times Best Seller list and received reviews from publications including Publishers Weekly and Kirkus Reviews.

References

External links 

 Ransom at Random House

2004 American novels
American romance novels

Novels by Danielle Steel
Delacorte Press books